Tinghir Province is a province of Morocco in the Drâa-Tafilalet Region. The province had a population of 322,412 people in 2014.

Administrative divisions

References

 
Provinces of Drâa-Tafilalet